The Young Witness is a newspaper published in Young, New South Wales, Australia. It has previously been published under the names Daily Witness and South West News Pictorial.

History
The Young Witness was first published in 1909. It has since undergone several name changes as well as absorbed several other newspapers from the Young region. It acquired the assets of the defunct Burrangong Argus in 1913. In 1923 the title changed to Daily Witness  but reverted to Young Witness in 1931. In 1947, the newspaper absorbed The Young Chronicle. The title was changed to South West News Pictorial in 1961 and this name remained until 1993 when it was merged with The Young Times. At this point the name reverted again to The Young Witness and it is still published under that name. The former editor is Craig Thomson. Rebecca Hewson is the Witness journalist.

Digitisation
The paper has been digitised as part of the Australian Newspapers Digitisation Program project of the National Library of Australia.

See also
 List of newspapers in Australia
 List of newspapers in New South Wales

References

External links
 
 
 The Young Witness

Newspapers published in New South Wales
Newspapers on Trove